Arraes is a surname. Notable people with the surname include:

 Luisa Arraes (born 1993), Brazilian actress
 Marília Arraes (born 1984), Brazilian politician
 Miguel Arraes (1916–2005), Brazilian lawyer and politician